Charles Gordon (born 28 October 1951, Glasgow) is a former Scottish Labour Party politician. He was the Member of the Scottish Parliament (MSP) for Glasgow Cathcart from 2005 to 2011.

Gordon was elected to the Strathclyde Regional Council in 1987 and remained a councillor until 1996, when Strathclyde Regional Council was abolished. He was President of the P.O.L.I.S. Network (Promoting Operational Links for Integrated Services) of European Cities and Regions applying information technology to transport, from 1992–1995. 

In 1995, he was elected to the new Glasgow City Council where he was Roads Convenor. He was Chair of the new Strathclyde Passenger Transport Authority from 1996 to 1999 and was elected Deputy Leader of Glasgow City Council in 1997. In 1999, he became Leader of Glasgow City Council, an office which he held until 2005. As Leader of Glasgow City Council he announced a project to regenerate of the Clyde waterfront.

In 2005, following the resignation of Mike Watson as the MSP for Glasgow Cathcart, Charlie was selected as the candidate and on 29 September 2005 won the by-election by 2,405 votes from the SNP candidate Maire Whitehead. In the 2011 Scottish Election, Charlie lost his seat by 1,592 votes to SNP candidate James Dornan.

Gordon is also a trade unionist starting off in the Woodworkers' Union before becoming a branch and district official in the National Union of Railwaymen/RMT. He is a former President of Glasgow Trades Council and is currently a member of the GMB union.

Family
Gordon has two adult sons from his first marriage and a son, Calum, with his second wife, Emma.

References

External links 
 
Re-Elect Charlie Gordon Website – 2011 Scottish Parliament Elections
Official Website
Re-Elect Charlie Gordon Website – 2007 Scottish Parliament Elections
£1B to Turn Clyde Fortunes, BBC News, 25 February 2002
Cathcart by-election candidates
Will New MSP Charlie Still Be The Voice Of Glasgow?, Evening Times, 30 September 2005
Newest MSP takes up Holyrood Post, BBC News, 5 October 2005
Holyrood Week, Brian Currie
Evening Times letters page
Scotland: Lack of Enterprise, BBC News, 19 June 2006

1951 births
Living people
Councillors in Glasgow
Labour MSPs
Scottish trade unionists
Members of the Scottish Parliament for Glasgow constituencies
Scottish Roman Catholics
Members of the Scottish Parliament 2003–2007
Members of the Scottish Parliament 2007–2011
People educated at St Mungo's Academy
Scottish Labour councillors
Leaders of local authorities of Scotland